St. Stephens is a census-designated place (CDP) in Catawba County, North Carolina, United States. The population was 8,759 at the 2010 census, down from 9,439 in 2000. It is part of the Hickory–Lenoir–Morganton Metropolitan Statistical Area.

Geography
St. Stephens is located in northern Catawba County at  (35.766578, -81.277342). It is bordered on the west by the city of Hickory, on the south by the city of Conover, and on the north by Alexander County, separated from St. Stephens by Lake Hickory on the Catawba River.

Demographics

2020 census

As of the 2020 United States census, there were 8,852 people, 3,609 households, and 2,527 families residing in the CDP.

2000 census
As of the census of 2000, there were 9,439 people, 3,506 households, and 2,675 families residing in the CDP. The population density was 962.2 people per square mile (371.5/km2). There were 3,683 housing units at an average density of 375.4/sq mi (145.0/km2). The racial makeup of the CDP was 88.77% White, 2.67% African American, 0.42% Native American, 2.79% Asian, 0.03% Pacific Islander, 4.06% from other races, and 1.26% from two or more races. Hispanic or Latino of any race were 9.76% of the population.

There were 3,509 households, out of which 34.1% had children under the age of 18 living with them, 60.8% were married couples living together, 10.0% had a female householder with no husband present, and 23.7% were non-families. 19.6% of all households were made up of individuals, and 7.2% had someone living alone who was 65 years of age or older. The average household size was 2.66 and the average family size was 3.01.

In the CDP, the population was spread out, with 24.6% under the age of 18, 9.3% from 18 to 24, 30.6% from 25 to 44, 24.0% from 45 to 64, and 11.5% who were 65 years of age or older. The median age was 36 years. For every 100 females, there were 104.5 males. For every 100 females age 18 and over, there were 101.2 males.

The median income for a household in the CDP was $41,790, and the median income for a family was $45,763. Males had a median income of $29,452 versus $24,248 for females. The per capita income for the CDP was $18,038. About 5.7% of families and 7.1% of the population were below the poverty line, including 8.2% of those under age 18 and 7.4% of those age 65 or over.

References

Census-designated places in Catawba County, North Carolina